"White Noise" is a song by Australian punk rock band The Living End. It was released on 5 July 2008, as the lead single from the band's album White Noise.

During the week of the song's release, it was the most played track on Australian radio stations and went on to top the Australian Airplay chart. The song has since been accredited platinum status in Australia. It also won the 2009 Song of the Year at the APRA Awards.

A music video for "White Noise" was produced, featuring The Living End playing on a car park rooftop in Brisbane. The single was also released on iTunes and Nokia Music, including bonus B-Sides.

Track listing
All tracks written by Chris Cheney.
"White Noise" – 3:44
"How Do We Know" – 4:14
"Listen Up Suzie" – 2:08

iTunes track listing
"White Noise" – 3:44
"CIA" – 4:24

Nokia Music track listing
"White Noise" – 3:44
"Live to Love" – 4:27

Charts

Year-end charts

References

External links
 'White Noise' Music Video

2008 singles
2008 songs
APRA Award winners
Dew Process singles
Songs written by Chris Cheney
The Living End songs